María Luisa González Benés, known artistically as Marisa de Leza (9 June 1933 – 13 October 2020), was a Spanish film and television actress. She died in Madrid after a long illness, aged 87.

Partial filmography

 I'm Not Mata Hari (1950) - Corista (uncredited)
 Apollo Theatre (1950)
 Day by Day (1951) - Luisa
 Furrows (1951) - Tonia
 Tercio de quites (1951) - Reyes
 Court of Justice (1953) - Victoria
 Lovers of Toledo (1953) - Isabella
 Fire in the Blood (1953)
 Under the Sky of Spain (1953) - Rosario
 Flight 971 (1953) - Hija del presidente Zavala
 La patrulla (1954) - Lucía
 Alexander the Great (1956) - Eurydice
 Andalusia Express (1956) - Lola
 Between Time and Eternity (1956)
 Mi permette, babbo! (1956) - Marina Biagi
 El andén (1957) - Pilar
 The Sun Comes Out Every Day (1958) - Lina
 La frontera del miedo (1958) - Celia Dubois
 Parque de Madrid (1959) - Chica en silla de ruedas
 Diego Corrientes (1959) - Beatriz
 The Gold Suit (1960) - Carmen
 The Big Show (1960) - Rita
 La moglie di mio marito (1961) - Carla
 Cerca de las estrellas (1962) - Margarita
 Cena de matrimonios (1962) - Laura
 La gran coartada (1963) - Ana
 Una madeja de lana azul celeste (1964)
 Destino: Barajas (1965)
 La otra orilla (1965)
 Valentina (1982) - Doña Julia
 1919, crónica del alba (1983) - Doña Julia
 Caminos de tiza (1988)
 You're the One (2000) - Madre de Julia
 Primer y último amor (2002) - Mali Boltaña
 Para que no me olvides (2005) - Leonor

Accolades

References

Bibliography
 D'Lugo, Marvin. Guide to the Cinema of Spain. Greenwood Publishing Group, 1997.

External links

1933 births
2020 deaths
Spanish television actresses
Spanish film actresses
People from Madrid